The Euphrates class was a five-ship class of iron screw troopships built for the Royal Navy during the 1860s. They were used for carrying troops to India, with two of them being later hulked and surviving into the early 20th Century.

Design
The Crimean War and Indian Mutiny in the 1850s both required that large numbers of troops be moved across the globe at short notice.  Although for both these conflicts commercial shipping companies were able to fulfil all the immediate requirements, it became apparent that there were severe handicaps to the system; in particular the availability of commercial shipping for trooping could not be guaranteed. It was decided to set up a regular service of Government transports and the Navy was ordered to build five specially-designed troopships.

With the Suez Canal due to be opened in 1869, the class was designed within the constraints of the new waterway.  Designed to carry an entire battalion of infantry, the result was a magnificent barque-rigged steamer of considerable size; with a top speed of 15 knots, and able to take the direct route via the Suez Canal, they were able to reduce the length of the voyage significantly, but perhaps more importantly, the uncertainty in the time needed to make the journey round the Cape of Good Hope was also reduced.

The five ships were ordered from various British shipbuilders, with  being built to a slightly different and smaller design. They were lightly armed with three 4-pounder guns, and were initially fitted with a  single-expansion trunk engine (except Serapis) and single screw, producing 700 nhp. However the engines were refitted on all of these ships during their active careers.  was completed with a 4-cylinder horizontal compound-expansion engine, but was re-engined in 1869 with a 2-cylinder single expansion engine. 's engines were originally 3-cylinder versions, and were modified to the compound type in 1873.

Career
The ships spent most of their active careers conveying British troops to and from the Indian subcontinent, although other voyages were made, most notably to Canada. Obsolete by the mid-1890s, Serapis, Euphrates and Crocodile were sold for breaking up. Malabar became a base ship at Bermuda in 1897, and was renamed HMS Terror in 1901. She was put on the disposal list in 1914 and was sold off in 1918, while Jumna survived as a coal hulk, eventually being sold off in 1922.

Ships

Identification
All the ships of the class could be distinguished by a different coloured hull band, with Crocodile wearing yellow, Euphrates blue, Jumna red, Malabar black and Serapis green.  Jumna’s blue hull band was to become the traditional identification feature for HM troopships.

Notes

References

 Lyon, David and Winfield, Rif, The Sail and Steam Navy List, All the Ships of the Royal Navy 1815-1889, pub Chatham, 2004,

External links

 
Troop ships of the Royal Navy
Auxiliary transport ship classes